The 2016 Men's League1 Ontario season was the third season of play for League1 Ontario, a Division 3 semi-professional soccer league in the Canadian soccer pyramid and the highest level of soccer based in the Canadian province of Ontario.

This season saw the return of all but one of the teams which completed the previous season, as well as the addition of five new teams for the men's division.

Changes from 2015 
Five new teams joined the men's division for this season. Aurora United FC, North Mississauga SC, North Toronto Nitros, Toronto Skillz FC added new entries, while FC London moved over from the Premier Development League.  One team (ANB Futbol) from 2015 did not renew their license, resulting in a 16-team competition and a change from a single-table format to a two-conference format.

The league's cup tournament for the men's division will be a single-elimination competition; eliminating the group stage seen in previous editions.

On June 16, 2016, Toronto FC entered into a partnership with the Windsor Stars wherein the latter would become a "regional satellite club" of the former, who would in turn provide technical and coaching development.  As part of the agreement, Windsor would become known as "Windsor TFC" in the future.  The agreement does not affect the participation in L1O of either the Windsor Stars or the TFC Academy team.

Teams

Standings 

Each team played 22 matches as part of the season; two against every team in their own conference, and one against every team in the opposing conference. The top team from each conference met at the end of the season to determine the league champion and face the PLSQ league champion in the Inter-Provincial Cup.

Eastern Conference

Western Conference

League Championship 
The league champion is determined by a single-match series between the top-ranked teams from the western and eastern conferences.

L1 Cup 
The cup tournament is a separate contest from the rest of the season, in which all sixteen teams from the men's division take part. It is not a form of playoffs at the end of the season (as is typically seen in North American sports), but is more like the Canadian Championship or the FA Cup, albeit only for League1 Ontario teams. All matches are separate from the regular season, and are not reflected in the season standings.

The cup tournament for the men's division is a single-match knockout tournament with four total rounds culminating in a final match at the end of July, with initial matchups determined by random draw. Each match in the tournament must return a result; any match drawn after 90 minutes will advance directly to kicks from the penalty mark instead of extra time.

Round of 16

Quarterfinals

Semifinals

Final

Inter-Provincial Cup Championship 
The Inter-Provincial Cup Championship was a two-legged home-and-away series between the league champions of League1 Ontario and the Première ligue de soccer du Québec – the only Division 3 men's semi-professional soccer leagues based fully within Canada.

CS Mont-Royal Outremont won 3–2 on aggregate

Statistics

Top scorers 

Source: League1 Ontario

Top goalkeepers 

Minimum 540 minutes played. Source: League1 Ontario

All-Star Game 

On July 25, the league announced the rosters for the first-ever all-star game, to be played between the eastern and western conferences. Eighteen players for each team were selected by coaches and league officials, and each roster contains at least one player from each team in their respective conference.

Due to the unavailability of some players, the league released updated rosters for both western and eastern teams on August 2.

Awards 

 First Team All-Stars

 Second Team All-Stars

References

External links 

League1
League1 Ontario seasons